The Taipei Metro Dahu Park station is located north of Dahu Park in Neihu District, Taipei, Taiwan. It is a station on Wenhu line.

Station overview

This three-level, elevated station features two side platforms, two exits, and platform elevators located on the north and south sides of the concourse level. It is named for the nearby Dahu Park, visible from the system between Dahu Park and Huzhou.

Public art for the station is titled "Flying Kites at Home in the Sky"; it consists of 12 sculptures and is located around the entrance area. While the glass walls of the entrance area resemble an aquarium, the kites give the illusion of aquatic animals floating in the tank.

History
22 February 2009: Dahu Park station construction is completed.
4 July 2009: Begins service with the opening of Brown Line.

Station layout

Nearby Places

 Dahu Park
 Hushan Park No. 5
 Dahu Cottage
 Dahu Elementary School
 Dahu Community
 Bailusishan

References

Wenhu line stations
Railway stations opened in 2009